ATA Airlines is an Iranian airline based in Tabriz International Airport. It operates scheduled domestic and international services in the Middle East, as well as charter services.

History
The airline was established on 17 December 2008 and started scheduled operations in 2010 with services on domestic routes. Its first flight was performed on 31 December 2009 from Tabriz to Mashhad.

The airline's name translates to 'father' in Turkish and Azeri languages. Although the company has a logo similar to American airline American Trans Air, it bears no relationship to that firm.

Destinations

Fleet

Current fleet
As of Jun 2022, the ATA Airlines fleet consisted of the following aircraft:

Former fleet
The airline previously operated the following aircraft (as of August 2017):
 1 further Airbus A320-200
 1 further Boeing 737-300

See also
 List of airlines of Iran

References

External links
 
 ATA Airlines official website  
 Airlines Fleet list
 ATA Airlines photos

Airlines of Iran
Airlines established in 2010
Transport in Tabriz
Iranian brands
Iranian companies established in 2010